The Czech Republic is a Central European country, a member of the European Union, the Organisation for Economic Co-operation and Development (OSCE), the North Atlantic Treaty Organization (NATO), the United Nations (and all of its main specialized agencies and boards). It entertains diplomatic relations with 191 countries of the world, around half of which maintain a resident embassy in the Czech capital city, Prague.

During the years 1948–1989, the foreign policy of Czechoslovakia had followed that of the Soviet Union. Since the revolution and the subsequent mutually-agreed peaceful dissolution of Czechoslovakia into the Czech Republic and Slovakia, the Czechs have made reintegration with Western institutions their chief foreign policy objective. This goal was rapidly met with great success, as the nation joined NATO in 1999 and the European Union in 2004, and held the Presidency of the European Union during the first half of 2009.

International disputes

Liechtenstein
The land was partially confiscated from the Liechtenstein family in 1918 with the rest of the property being confiscated in 1945 after the expulsion of Germans and confiscation of German property. The Czech Republic insisted that it could not acknowledge or be responsible for claims going back to before February 1948, when the Communists had seized power.

As a result, Liechtenstein did not diplomatically recognize the existence of the Czech Republic as a new state (and, for that matter, also that of the Slovak Republic) until 2009.

In July 2009, the Prince of Liechtenstein announced he was resigning to the previous unsuccessful claims to property located in the Czech Republic, and on 13 July 2009, after politically recognizing one another, the Czech Republic and Liechtenstein formally established diplomatic relations.

Placement of US National Missile Defense base
In February 2007, the US started formal negotiations with Czech Republic and Poland concerning construction of missile shield installations in those countries for a Ground-based Midcourse Defense System. Government of the Czech Republic agrees (while 67% Czechs disagree and only about 22% support it) to host a missile defense radar on its territory while a base of missile interceptors is supposed to be built in Poland. The objective is reportedly to protect another parts of US National Missile Defense from long-range missile strikes from Iran and North Korea, but Czech PM Mirek Topolánek said the main reason is to avoid Russian influence and strengthen ties to US.

The main government supporter Alexandr Vondra, Deputy Prime Minister for European affairs, used to be an ambassador to the USA. More problematic is that between 2004 and 2006 he was an executive director of a lobbying company Dutko Worldwide Prague. Dutko's and its strategic partner AMI Communications (PR company) customers are Boeing, Lockheed Martin, Nortrop Grumman, which are largest contractors for NMD development. AMI Communications also received (without a formal selection procedure) a government contract to persuade Czechs to support US radar base.

Bilateral relations

Africa

Americas

Asia

Europe

Oceania

Multilateral relations
Foreign relations of the European Union
Foreign relations of NATO

Notes

See also

List of diplomatic missions in the Czech Republic
List of diplomatic missions of the Czech Republic
Visa policy of the Schengen Area
Visa requirements for Czech citizens
Visa (document)#Visa restrictions

References

External links
 Concept of foreign policy of the Czech Republic

 
Government of the Czech Republic